The 1940–42 Bolivian National Congress was a meeting the Bolivian legislature composed of the Chamber of Senators and Chamber of Deputies. It met in La Paz from 12 April 1940 to 1942 during the final four days of the interim government of Carlos Quintanilla and the first two years of the Enrique Peñaranda's presidency.

The Congress was elected as part of the general election held on 10 March 1940.

Leadership

Chamber of Senators 

 President: Alberto Saavedra Nogales (PRS), until October 1949
 Arturo Galindo (PL), until November 1941
 Walter Belmonte Pool (PRS), from November 1941

Chamber of Deputies 

 President: Rafael de Ugarte (PRG), until August 1941
 Jorge Aráoz Campero (PSI), from August 1941

Composition

Chamber of Senators 
1940–1942 members of the Chamber of Senators:

Chamber of Deputies 
1940–1942  members of the Chamber of Deputies:

References 

Political history of Bolivia